KYSJ (1270 AM) is a radio station broadcasting a classic rock format, licensed to St. Joseph, Missouri, United States. The station is currently owned by Eagle Communications, Inc.

History

KUSN 
In 1955, Julius B. Spears, an Overland Park, Kansas real estate developer, obtained the construction permit for a new station in St. Joseph. KUSN went on the air on November 7, 1955 on 1270 kHz with 1 kW daytime only. The initial lineup for the station consisted of Station Manager, Hal Hamilton; Assistant Station Manager and Promotions Director, Don Blue; Women's Programming and traffic manager, Eleanor Shepherd and disc jockeys Jay Bennett, Vic Kearns and Joe Killgore. The transmitter was at the present Leonard Road location, with studios at the historic Hotel Robidoux in downtown St. Joseph. The Robidoux studios were previously used by KFEQ radio, and KVAK (later KAIR in Atchison.) In January 1958, Spears sold the station to Kansas/Iowa broadcast group owners Wyman Schnepp and Fred Reynolds for $50K after being unable to make it financially viable. Schnepp sold the station only a few months later in October 1958 to Charles Norman, a St. Louis-area broadcaster for $90K. The studios moved to the fifth floor of the Howitt Building (also known as the KFEQ building) at 8th and Frederick Avenue, in studios also previously inhabited by KFEQ radio on January 2, 1959. Struggling to make the daytimer financially viable, the station was sold in July 1959 to Midland Broadcasters, a company of Fred Reynolds, who owned the facility until 1977. After the station's application to broadcast after sunset was denied by the FCC in 1960, the station launched an FM counterpart from the Howitt Building location, with 3 kW ERP on 105.1 MHz.

As an AM music format daytimer in the 1960s, the station struggled with ratings and competition from full-time AM, and later FM, stations in the St. Joseph and Kansas City markets. In September 1966, the station moved from a Top 40 sound to middle-of-the-road music; in November 1967, it flipped to country music. KUSN-FM simulcast the AM formats during much of the same period and also ran a beautiful music format. While the station was small, it had a strong impact on the market and was the launching pad for the early careers of many major market radio broadcasting personalities, including sportscaster George Michael, Skinny Bobby Harper (often attributed as the inspiration for the Dr. Johnny Fever character on WKRP), Rich "Brother" Robbin (who would work in radio in San Diego), and others.

In 1972, the station moved its studios and the FM transmitter to their 2414 South Leonard Road transmitter location due to the Howitt Building studio location scheduled for demolition under the Urban Renewal program. In 1974, KUSN-FM was increased to an ERP of 27.5 kW, new call letters KSFT were assigned, and the station was programmed with the Schulke automated beautiful music format. The station was sold to Hunter Broadcasting Group from Jacksonville, Illinois in 1977. Upon its sale in 1979 to Orama, the AM and FM combination was split up; the FM was sold to AM competitor KKJO at that time and became KKJO-FM, while KUSN became KGNM in 1981 after Orama was acquired by Good News Ministries.

KGNM 
From 1981 until 2013, KGNM was a Christian station. In 2013, Good News Ministries moved the religious programming to 91.1 FM and Orama installed a classic hits format on 1270. In May 2020, Orama agreed to sell KGNM and its translator to Eagle Communications, Inc., owner of St. Joseph's other four commercial stations (KFEQ, KKJO, KESJ, and KSJQ).

KYSJ 
On June 15, 2020, KGNM changed their format to classic rock, branded as "KY 102". The "KY 102" branding was previously on KYYS (102.1 FM) in Kansas City from 1974 to 1997. The sale to Eagle Communications was consummated on September 24, 2020, at a price of $160,000. On October 15, 2020, KGNM changed their call letters to KYSJ.

Previous logo

References

External links

FCC History Cards for KYSJ

YSJ
Radio stations established in 1956
1956 establishments in Missouri
Classic rock radio stations in the United States